Megachile derelicta is a species of bee in the Megachilidae family. It was first described in 1913 by Theodore Dru Alison Cockerell.

References

Derelicta
Insects described in 1913